Magdolna Kovács is a Hungarian orienteering competitor. At the 1976 World Orienteering Championships in Aviemore she received a bronze medal in the relay with the Hungarian team (with Irén Rostás and Sarolta Monspart). In 1979 she finished 14th in the individual event.

References

Year of birth missing (living people)
Living people
Hungarian orienteers
Female orienteers
Foot orienteers
World Orienteering Championships medalists